The 2022–23 Mid-American Conference women's basketball season is the season for Mid-American Conference women's basketball teams. It began with practices in October 2022, followed by the start of the 2022–23 NCAA Division I women's basketball season in November. Conference play will began in January 2022 and concluded in March 2022. The 2023 MAC tournament was scheduled to be held at Rocket Mortgage FieldHouse in Cleveland, Ohio for the 23rd consecutive season.

Toledo won the regular season championship with a 16–2 record and defeated second seeded Bowling Green in the MAC tournament final to earn the conference's automatic bid into the 2023 NCAA tournament. Quinesha Lockett of Toledo was the MVP of both the regular season and the tournament.

Head coaches

Coaching changes

Buffalo
On March 26, 2022, Felisha Legette-Jack, who had been the head coach at Buffalo since 2012, was hired as the head coach of her alma mater Syracuse. In 10 years Legette-Jack compiled a 201–114 at Buffalo with three MAC tournament titles, four NCAA tournament appearances, and three NCAA tournament wins. On April 6 Buffalo announced USC Upstate head coach Becky Burke as their new head coach.

Coaches

Notes: 
 Appearances, titles, etc. are from time with current school only. 
 Years at school includes 2022–23 season.
 MAC records are from time at current school only.
 All statistics and are through the beginning of the season.

Preseason
The preseason coaches' poll and league awards were announced by the league office on October 27, 2022.  Defending 2021–22 regular season champion Toledo was named the favorite.

Preseason women's basketball coaches poll

MAC Tournament Champions: Toledo (9), Ball State (3)

MAC Preseason All-Conference

Regular season
The schedule was released in late August.

Record against ranked non-conference opponents
This is a list of games against ranked opponents only (rankings from the AP Poll):

{| class="wikitable"
|-
! Date !! Visitor !! Home !! Site !! Significance !! Score !! Conference Record
|- style="background: #ffe6e6;"
| Nov 7 || Northern Illinois || No. 9 Notre Dame || Purcell Pavilion ● Notre Dame, IN || ― || L 48–88 || 0–1
|- style="background: #ffe6e6;"
| Nov 16 || Western Michigan || No. 23 Michigan || Crisler Center ● Ann Arbor, MI || ― || L 67–99 || 0–2
|- style="background: #ffe6e6;"
| Nov 17 || No. 8 Ohio State || Ohio || Convocation Center ● Athens, OH || ― || L 56–86 || 0–3
|- style="background: #ffe6e6;"
| Nov 17 || Bowling Green || No. 12 Indiana || Simon Skjodt Assembly Hall ● Bloomington, IN || ― || L 61–96 || 0–4
|- style="background: #ffe6e6;"
| Nov 20 || Ball State || No. 9 Notre Dame || Purcell Pavilion ● Notre Dame, IN || ― || L 60–95 || 0–5|- style="background:#ccffcc;"
| Dec 8 || Toledo || No. 14 Michigan || Crisler Center ● Ann Arbor, MI || ― || W 71–68 || 1–5 
|- style="background: #ffe6e6;"
| Dec 21 || Western Michigan || No. 5 Notre Dame || Purcell Pavilion ● Notre Dame, IN || ― || L 57–85 || 1–6'|}Team rankings are reflective of AP poll when the game was played, not current or final ranking† denotes game was played on neutral site''

Rankings

All-MAC Awards

Mid-American women's basketball weekly awards

Postseason

Mid–American Tournament

Toledo defeated Bowling Green in the final to earn the conference's automatic bid into the 2023 NCAA tournament. Quinesha Lockett of Toledo was the MVP.

NCAA tournament

Toledo was placed as the twelfth seed in the Seattle Region 3 of the 2023 NCAA tournament where they defeated Iowa State in the first round.  They will play Tennessee in the second round.

Women's National Invitation Tournament

Bowling Green, Ball State, and Kent State accepted bids to the WNIT.

Women's National Invitation Tournament

Northern Illinois accepted a to the WBI where they lost to Georgia Southern in the first round.

Postseason Awards

Coach of the Year: Tricia Cullop, Toledo
Player of the Year: Quinesha Lockett, Senior, Guard, Toledo
Freshman of the Year: Sydney Harris, Guard/Forward, Central Michigan
Defensive Player of the Year: Nyla Hampton, Junior, Guard, Bowling Green
Sixth Player of the Year: Janae Poisson, Graduate Student, Guard, Northern Illinois

Honors

See also
2022–23 Mid-American Conference men's basketball season

References